The 2019 Philadelphia Phillies season was the 137th season in the history of the franchise, their 16th season at Citizens Bank Park, and their final season with manager Gabe Kapler. The Phillies improved from their record the prior year and finished with an 81–81 record (.500 winning percentage) for the first time since 2012, but missed the playoffs for the 8th straight season, despite spending nearly $400 million in the offseason.

Offseason 
After an 80–82 record the previous season which included a late-season collapse, the Phillies made several transactions in the 2018–19 offseason in order to improve the team. On December 3, 2018, the Phillies acquired Jean Segura, Juan Nicasio, and James Pazos from the Seattle Mariners for Carlos Santana and J. P. Crawford. Three days later, the Phillies traded relief pitcher Luis Garcia to the Los Angeles Angels for relief pitcher José Álvarez. Free agent outfielder Andrew McCutchen was signed December 12 to a three-year-deal. Relief pitcher David Robertson signed a two-year deal with the Phillies on January 3, 2019. On February 7, the Phillies acquired catcher J. T. Realmuto from the Miami Marlins for Sixto Sanchez, Jorge Alfaro, Will Stewart and international bonus slot money. Finally, on March 2, the Phillies signed outfielder Bryce Harper to a record-breaking 13-year deal worth $330 million.

Season standings

National League East

National League Wild Card

Record vs. opponents

Game log

|- style="background:#bfb"
| 1 || March 28 || Braves || 10–4 || Aaron Nola (1–0) || Julio Teherán (0–1) || — || 44,469 || 1–0
|- style="background:#bfb"
| 2 || March 30 || Braves || 8–6 || Adam Morgan (1–0) || Wes Parsons (0–1) || — || 44,597 || 2–0
|- style="background:#bfb"
| 3 || March 31 || Braves || 5–1 || Jake Arrieta (1–0) || Kyle Wright (0–1) || — || 41,410 || 3–0
|-

|- style="background:#bfb"
| 4 || April 2 || @ Nationals || 8–2 || Zach Eflin (1–0)  || Max Scherzer (0–2) || — || 35,920 || 4–0
|- style="background:#fbb"
| 5 || April 3 || @ Nationals || 8–9 || Sean Doolittle (2–0)  || David Robertson (0–1) || — || 20,050 || 4–1
|- style="background:#bfb"
| 6 || April 5 || Twins || 10–4 || Nick Pivetta (1–0) || Jake Odorizzi (0–1) || — || 28,021 || 5–1
|- style="background:#fbb"
| 7 || April 6 || Twins || 2–6 || Michael Pineda (1–0) || Jake Arrieta (1–1) || — || 44,693 || 5–2
|- style="background:#bfb"
| 8 || April 7 || Twins || 2–1 || Zach Eflin (2–0) || José Berríos (1–1) || Héctor Neris (1) || 39,735 || 6–2
|- style="background:#bfb"
| 9 || April 8 || Nationals || 4–3 ||  || Aníbal Sánchez (0–1) || Pat Neshek (1) || 28,212 || 7–2
|- style="background:#fbb"
| 10 || April 9 || Nationals || 6–10 (10) || Sean Doolittle (3–0) || José Álvarez (0–1) || — || 38,073 || 7–3
|- style="background:#fbb"
| 11 || April 10 || Nationals || 1–15 || Jeremy Hellickson (1–0)  || Nick Pivetta (1–1) || — || 30,805 || 7–4
|- style="background:#bfb"
| 12 || April 12 || @ Marlins || 9–1 || Jake Arrieta (2–1) || Sandy Alcántara (1–1) || — || 9,322 || 8–4
|- style="background:#fbb"
| 13 || April 13 || @ Marlins || 3–10 || Caleb Smith (1–0) || Zach Eflin (2–1) || — || 13,828 || 8–5
|- style="background:#bfb"
| 14 || April 14 || @ Marlins || 3–1 (14) || Víctor Arano (1–0) || Wei-Yin Chen (0–1) || José Álvarez (1) || 15,238 || 9–5
|- style="background:#fbb"
| 15 || April 15 || Mets || 6–7 (11) || Luis Avilán (1–0) || Pat Neshek (0–1) || Edwin Díaz (6) || 32,423 || 9–6
|- style="background:#bfb"
| 16 || April 16 || Mets || 14–3 || Nick Pivetta (2–1) || Steven Matz (1–1) || Jerad Eickhoff (1) || 43,933 || 10–6
|- style="background:#bfb"
| 17 || April 17 || Mets || 3–2 || Jake Arrieta (3–1) || Zack Wheeler (1–2) || Héctor Neris (2) || 39,861 || 11–6
|- style="background:#fbb"
| 18 || April 18 || @ Rockies || 2–6 || Kyle Freeland (2–3) || Zach Eflin (2–2) || — || 27,562 || 11–7
|- style="background:#fbb"
| 19 || April 19 || @ Rockies || 3–4 (12) || Chad Bettis (1–2) || Juan Nicasio (0–1) || — || 35,423 || 11–8
|- style="background:#bfb"
| 20 || April 20 || @ Rockies || 8–5 || Aaron Nola (2–0) || Antonio Senzatela (1–1) || Héctor Neris (3) || 40,530 || 12–8
|- style="background:#fbb"
| 21 || April 21 || @ Rockies || 1–4 || Jon Gray (2–3) || Jerad Eickhoff (0–1) || — || 28,287 || 12–9
|- style="background:#fbb"
| 22 || April 22 || @ Mets || 1–5 || Steven Matz (2–1) || Jake Arrieta (3–2) || — || 25,293 || 12–10
|- style="background:#fbb"
| 23 || April 23 || @ Mets || 0–9 || Zack Wheeler (2–2) || Zach Eflin (2–3) || — || 26,049 || 12–11
|- style="background:#bfb"
| 24 || April 24 || @ Mets || 6–0 || Vince Velasquez (1–0) || Jason Vargas (1–1) || — || 27,685 || 13–11
|- style="background:#fbb"
| 25 || April 25 || Marlins || 1–3 (10) || Tayron Guerrero (1–0) || Héctor Neris (0–1) || Sergio Romo (4) || 32,060 || 13–12
|- style="background:#bfb"
| 26 || April 26 || Marlins || 4–0 || Jerad Eickhoff (1–1) || José Ureña (1–4) || — || 31,159 || 14–12
|- style="background:#bfb"
| 27 || April 27 || Marlins || 12–9 || Jake Arrieta (4–2) || Trevor Richards (0–4) || Héctor Neris (4) || 37,868 || 15–12
|- style="background:#bfb"
| 28 || April 28 || Marlins || 5–1 || Zach Eflin (3–3) || Pablo López (2–4) || — || 39,168 || 16–12
|- style="background:#fbb"
| 29 || April 30 || Tigers || 1–3 || Spencer Turnbull (2–2) || Vince Velasquez (1–1) || Shane Greene (12) || 31,759 || 16–13
|-

|- style="background:#bfb"
| 30 || May 1 || Tigers || 7–3 ||  || Buck Farmer (1–2) || — || 28,103 || 17–13
|- style="background:#bfb"
| 31 || May 3 || Nationals || 4–2 ||  || Dan Jennings (0–1) || Héctor Neris (5) || 33,125 || 18–13
|- style="background:#fbb"
| 32 || May 4 || Nationals || 8–10 || Tony Sipp (1–1) || Adam Morgan (1–1) || Sean Doolittle (5) || 43,319 || 18–14
|- style="background:#bfb"
| 33 || May 5 || Nationals || 7–1 || Zach Eflin (4–3) || Aníbal Sánchez (0–5) || — || 40,497 || 19–14
|- style="background:#fbb"
| 34 || May 6 || @ Cardinals || 0–6 || Miles Mikolas (4–2) || Vince Velasquez (1–2) || — || 38,419 || 19–15
|- style="background:#bfb"
| 35 || May 7 || @ Cardinals || 11–1 || Aaron Nola (3–0) || Dakota Hudson (2–3) || — || 38,562 || 20–15
|- style="background:#bfb"
| 36 || May 8 || @ Cardinals || 5–0 || Jerad Eickhoff (2–1) || Jack Flaherty (3–3) || — || 42,309 || 21–15
|- style="background:#fbb"
| 37 || May 10 || @ Royals || 1–5 || Homer Bailey (4–3) || Jake Arrieta (4–3) || — || 20,015 || 21–16
|- style="background:#bfb"
| 38 || May 11 || @ Royals || 7–0 || Zach Eflin (5–3) || Brad Keller (2–4) || — || 24,463 || 22–16
|- style="background:#bfb"
| 39 || May 12 || @ Royals || 6–1 || Cole Irvin (1–0) || Jakob Junis (3–4) || — || 19,640 || 23–16
|- style="background:#bfb"
| 40 || May 13 || Brewers || 7–4 || Adam Morgan (2–1) || Matt Albers (2–2) || Pat Neshek (2) || 26,169 || 24–16
|- style="background:#fbb"
| 41 || May 14 || Brewers || 1–6 || Brandon Woodruff (6–1) || Jerad Eickhoff (2–2) || — || 31,533 || 24–17
|- style="background:#fbb"
| 42 || May 15 || Brewers || 2–5 || Gio González (2–0) || Jake Arrieta (4–4) || Josh Hader (11) || 28,129 || 24–18
|- style="background:#fbb"
| 43 || May 16 || Brewers || 3–11 || Zach Davies (5–0) || Zach Eflin (5–4) || — || 38,346 || 24–19
|- style="background:#bfb"
| 44 || May 17 || Rockies || 5–4 || Cole Irvin (2–0) || Jon Gray (3–4) || Héctor Neris (6) || 28,079 || 25–19
|- style="background:#bfb"
| 45 || May 18 || Rockies || 2–1 || Aaron Nola (4–0) || Antonio Senzatela (3–3) || Héctor Neris (7) || 42,354 || 26–19
|- style="background:#bfb"
| 46 || May 19 || Rockies || 7–5 || Édgar García (1–0) || Bryan Shaw (2–1) || Pat Neshek (3) || 38,603 || 27–19
|- style="background:#bfb"
| 47 || May 20 || @ Cubs || 5–4 (10) || Héctor Neris (1–1) || Kyle Ryan (0–1) || Juan Nicasio (1) || 37,909 || 28–19
|- style="background:#fbb"
| 48 || May 21 || @ Cubs || 2–3 || Kyle Ryan (1–1) || Juan Nicasio (0–2) || — || 36,768 || 28–20
|- style="background:#fbb"
| 49 || May 22 || @ Cubs || 4–8 || Tyler Chatwood (3–0) || Cole Irvin (2–1) || — || 39,246 || 28–21
|- style="background:#bfb"
| 50 || May 23 || @ Cubs || 9–7 || Aaron Nola (5–0) || Jon Lester (3–3) || Héctor Neris (8) || 37,173 || 29–21
|- style="background:#bfb"
| 51 || May 24 || @ Brewers || 6–4 || Vince Velasquez (2–2) || Freddy Peralta (2–2) || Héctor Neris (9) || 40,254 || 30–21
|- style="background:#bfb"
| 52 || May 25 || @ Brewers || 7–2 || Jake Arrieta (5–4) || Jhoulys Chacín (3–6) || — || 42,475 || 31–21
|- style="background:#fbb"
| 53 || May 26 || @ Brewers || 1–9 || Brandon Woodruff (7–1) || Zach Eflin (5–5) || — || 44,174 || 31–22
|- style="background:#bfb"
| 54 || May 28 || Cardinals || 4–3 || Nick Pivetta (3–1) || Adam Wainwright (4–5) || Héctor Neris (10) || 29,084 || 32–22
|- style="background:#bfb"
| 55 || May 29 || Cardinals || 11–4 || Aaron Nola (6–0) || Génesis Cabrera (0–1) || — || 30,486 || 33–22
|- style="background:#fbb"
| 56 || May 30 || Cardinals || 3–5 || Dakota Hudson (4–3) || Jerad Eickhoff (2–3) || Jordan Hicks (11) || 31,206 || 33–23
|- style="background:#fbb"
| 57 || May 31 || @ Dodgers || 3–6 || Kenta Maeda (7–2) || Jake Arrieta (5–5) || Kenley Jansen (17) || 54,307 || 33–24
|-

|- style="background:#fbb"
| 58 || June 1 || @ Dodgers || 3–4 || Julio Urías (3–2)  || Héctor Neris (1–2) || — || 53,507 || 33–25
|- style="background:#fbb"
| 59 || June 2 || @ Dodgers || 0–8 || Rich Hill (2–1) || Vince Velasquez (2–3) || — || 49,162 || 33–26
|- style="background:#fbb"
| 60 || June 3 || @ Padres || 2–8 || Eric Lauer (5–4) || Aaron Nola (6–1) || — || 21,654 || 33–27
|- style="background:#bfb"
| 61 || June 4 || @ Padres || 9–6 || Jerad Eickhoff (3–3) || Chris Paddack (4–4) || Héctor Neris (11) || 25,821 || 34–27
|- style="background:#bfb"
| 62 || June 5 || @ Padres || 7–5 || Juan Nicasio (1–2) || Craig Stammen (4–2) || Héctor Neris (12) || 23,004 || 35–27
|- style="background:#bfb"
| 63 || June 7 || Reds || 4–2 || Zach Eflin (6–5) || Tyler Mahle (2–6) || Héctor Neris (13) || 32,058 || 36–27
|- style="background:#bfb"
| 64 || June 8 || Reds || 4–1 || Nick Pivetta (4–1) || Tanner Roark (4–5) || — || 44,357 || 37–27
|- style="background:#fbb"
| 65 || June 9 || Reds || 3–4 || Zach Duke (3–1) || José Álvarez (0–2) || Raisel Iglesias (13) || 42,324 || 37–28
|- style="background:#fbb"
| 66 || June 10 || Diamondbacks || 8–13 || Zack Godley (3–4) || Jerad Eickhoff (3–4) || — || 26,255 || 37–29
|- style="background:#bfb"
| 67 || June 11 || Diamondbacks || 7–4 || Jake Arrieta (6–5) || Jon Duplantier (1–1) || Héctor Neris (14) || 26,321 || 38–29
|- style="background:#fbb"
| 68 || June 12 || Diamondbacks || 0–2 || Merrill Kelly (7–6) || Zach Eflin (6–6) || Greg Holland (10) || 29,047 || 38–30
|- style="background:#fbb"
| 69 || June 14 || @ Braves || 8–9 || Jerry Blevins (1–0) || Héctor Neris (1–3) || — || 41,975 || 38–31
|- style="background:#bfb"
| 70 || June 15 || @ Braves || 6–5 || Edubray Ramos (1–0) || Luke Jackson (3–2) || Héctor Neris (15) || 43,593 || 39–31
|- style="background:#fbb"
| 71 || June 16 || @ Braves || 1–15 || Mike Foltynewicz (2–5) || Vince Velasquez (2–4) || — || 40,855 || 39–32
|- style="background:#bbb"
| — || June 17 || @ Nationals || colspan=6 | Postponed (rain); Makeup: June 19 as a day-night doubleheader
|- style="background:#bbb"
| — || June 18 || @ Nationals || colspan=6 | Postponed (rain); Makeup: September 24 as a day-night doubleheader
|- style="background:#fbb"
| 72 || June 19 (1) || @ Nationals || 2–6 || Patrick Corbin (6–5) || Zach Eflin (6–7) || — || 17,961 || 39–33
|- style="background:#fbb"
| 73 || June 19 (2) || @ Nationals || 0–2 || Max Scherzer (6–5) || Jake Arrieta (6–6) || Sean Doolittle (15) || 24,220 || 39–34
|- style="background:#fbb"
| 74 || June 20 || @ Nationals || 4–7 || Javy Guerra (1–0) || Nick Pivetta (4–2) || Sean Doolittle (16) || 31,329 || 39–35
|- style="background:#fbb"
| 75 || June 21 || Marlins || 1–2 || Sandy Alcántara (4–6) || Aaron Nola (6–2) || Sergio Romo (14) || 44,420 || 39–36
|- style="background:#fbb"
| 76 || June 22 || Marlins || 3–5 || Austin Brice (1–0) || Adam Morgan (2–2) || José Quijada (1) || 44,722 || 39–37
|- style="background:#fbb"
| 77 || June 23 || Marlins || 4–6 || Jordan Yamamoto (3–0) ||  || Nick Anderson (1) || 36,749 || 39–38
|- style="background:#bfb"
| 78 || June 24 || Mets || 13–7 || Zach Eflin (7–7) || Steven Matz (5–6) || — || 29,117 || 40–38
|- style="background:#bfb"
| 79 || June 25 || Mets || 7–5 || Jake Arrieta (7–6) || Wilmer Font (1–2) || Héctor Neris (16) || 28,125 || 41–38
|- style="background:#bfb"
| 80 || June 26 || Mets || 5–4 (10) || Édgar García (2–0) || Stephen Nogosek (0–1) || — || 29,822 || 42–38
|- style="background:#bfb"
| 81 || June 27 || Mets || 6–3 || JD Hammer (1–0) || Edwin Díaz (1–5) || — || 39,161 || 43–38
|- style="background:#fbb"
| 82 || June 28 || @ Marlins || 2–6 || Elieser Hernández (1–2) || Vince Velasquez (2–5) || — || 9,469 || 43–39
|- style="background:#fbb"
| 83 || June 29 || @ Marlins || 6–9 || Jarlin García (2–0) || Adam Morgan (2–3) || Sergio Romo (15) || 14,774 || 43–40
|- style="background:#bfb"
| 84 || June 30 || @ Marlins || 13–6 || Jake Arrieta (8–6) || Trevor Richards (3–9) || — || 11,742 || 44–40
|-

|- style="background:#bfb"
| 85 || July 2 || @ Braves || 2–0 || Aaron Nola (7–2) || Dallas Keuchel (1–2) || Héctor Neris (17) || 40,180 || 45–40
|- style="background:#fbb"
| 86 || July 3 || @ Braves || 2–9 || Bryse Wilson (1–0) || Nick Pivetta (4–3) || — || 40,147 || 45–41
|- style="background:#fbb"
| 87 || July 4 || @ Braves || 6–12 || A. J. Minter (3–4) || Zach Eflin (7–8) || — || 40,633 || 45–42
|- style="background:#bfb"
| 88 || July 5 || @ Mets || 7–2 || Adam Morgan (3–3) || Edwin Díaz (1–6) || — || 32,546 || 46–42
|- style="background:#fbb"
| 89 || July 6 || @ Mets || 5–6 || Noah Syndergaard (6–4) || Jake Arrieta (8–7) || Edwin Díaz (19) || 31,350 || 46–43
|- style="background:#bfb"
| 90 || July 7 || @ Mets || 8–3 || Aaron Nola (8–2) || Zack Wheeler (6–6) || — || 34,247 || 47–43
|- style="background:#bbcaff;"
| – || July 9 ||colspan="7" | 2019 Major League Baseball All-Star Game at Progressive Field in Cleveland
|- style="background:#fbb"
| 91 || July 12 || Nationals || 0–4 ||  || Nick Pivetta (4–4) || — || 42,318 || 47–44
|- style="background:#fbb"
| 92 || July 13 || Nationals || 3–4 || Wander Suero (2–4) || Héctor Neris (1–4) || Sean Doolittle (20) || 43,732 || 47–45
|- style="background:#bfb"
| 93 || July 14 || Nationals || 4–3 || Héctor Neris (2–4) || Matt Grace (0–2) || — || 43,075 || 48–45
|- style="background:#fbb"
| 94 || July 15 || Dodgers || 2–16 || Clayton Kershaw (8–2) || Zach Eflin (7–9) || — || 30,025 || 48–46
|- style="background:#bfb"
| 95 || July 16 || Dodgers || 9–8 || Ranger Suárez (1–0) || Kenley Jansen (3–3) || — || 31,076 || 49–46
|- style="background:#fbb"
| 96 || July 17 || Dodgers || 2–7 || Pedro Báez (4–2) || Juan Nicasio (1–3) || — || 31,067 || 49–47
|- style="background:#bfb"
| 97 || July 18 || Dodgers || 7–6 || Ranger Suárez (2–0) || Dylan Floro (4–3) || Héctor Neris (18) || 38,043 || 50–47
|- style="background:#bfb"
| 98 || July 19 || @ Pirates || 6–1 || Juan Nicasio (2–3) || Richard Rodríguez (3–4) || Cole Irvin (1) || 34,117 || 51–47
|- style="background:#fbb"
| 99 || July 20 || @ Pirates || 1–5 || Joe Musgrove (7–8) || Zach Eflin (7–10) || — || 38,380 || 51–48
|- style="background:#bfb"
| 100 || July 21 || @ Pirates || 2–1  || Ranger Suárez (3–0) || Chris Stratton (1–3) || — || 24,830 || 52–48
|- style="background:#bfb"
| 101 || July 23 || @ Tigers || 3–2  || José Álvarez (1–2) || Daniel Stumpf (1–1) || — || 23,607 || 53–48
|- style="background:#bfb"
| 102 || July 24 || @ Tigers || 4–0 || Vince Velasquez (3–5) ||  || — || 33,735 || 54–48
|- style="background:#fbb"
| 103 || July 26 || Braves || 2–9 || Sean Newcomb (4–1) || Jake Arrieta (8–8) || — || 31,268 || 54–49
|- style="background:#fbb"
| 104 || July 27 || Braves || 7–15 || Max Fried (11–4) || Zach Eflin (7–11) || — || 39,340 || 54–50
|- style="background:#bfb"
| 105 || July 28 || Braves || 9–4 || Aaron Nola (9–2) || Kevin Gausman (3–6) || — || 37,037 || 55–50
|- style="background:#bfb"
| 106 || July 30 || Giants || 4–2 || Drew Smyly (2–5) || Tyler Beede (3–5) || Héctor Neris (19) || 32,217 || 56–50
|- style="background:#fbb"
| 107 || July 31 || Giants || 1–5 || Jeff Samardzija (8–8) || Vince Velasquez (3–6) || — || 31,313 || 56–51
|-

|- style="background:#bfb"
| 108 || August 1 || Giants || 10–2 || José Álvarez (2–2) ||  || — || 28,524 || 57–51
|- style="background:#fbb"
| 109 || August 2 || White Sox || 3–4  || Josh Osich (1–0) || Roman Quinn (0–1) || — || 26,635 || 57–52
|- style="background:#bfb"
| 110 || August 3 || White Sox || 3–2 || Aaron Nola (10–2) || Ross Detwiler (1–2) || Nick Pivetta (1) || 32,647 || 58–52
|- style="background:#fbb"
| 111 || August 4 || White Sox || 5–10 || Reynaldo López (6–9) || Drew Smyly (2–6) || — || 31,562 || 58–53
|- style="background:#bfb"
| 112 || August 5 || @ Diamondbacks || 7–3 || Vince Velasquez (4–6) || Merrill Kelly (7–12) || — || 18,319 || 59–53
|- style="background:#fbb"
| 113 || August 6 || @ Diamondbacks || 4–8 || Andrew Chafin (1–2) || Ranger Suárez (3–1) || — || 17,446 || 59–54
|- style="background:#fbb"
| 114 || August 7 || @ Diamondbacks || 1–6 || Zac Gallen (2–3) || Jason Vargas (6–6) || — || 18,140 || 59–55
|- style="background:#fbb"
| 115 || August 8 || @ Giants || 0–5 ||  || Aaron Nola (10–3) || — || 37,667 || 59–56
|- style="background:#bfb"
| 116 || August 9 || @ Giants || 9–6 || José Álvarez (3–2) || Tony Watson (2–1) || Héctor Neris (20) || 36,275 || 60–56
|- style="background:#fbb"
| 117 || August 10 || @ Giants || 1–3 || Jeff Samardzija (9–9) || Vince Velasquez (4–7) || Will Smith (28) || 39,106 || 60–57
|- style="background:#fbb"
| 118 || August 11 || @ Giants || 6–9 || Will Smith (4–0) || José Álvarez (3–3) || — || 36,637 || 60–58
|- style="background:#bfb"
| 119 || August 13 || Cubs || 4–2 || Blake Parker (2–2) || Kyle Ryan (3–2) || Héctor Neris (21) || 26,442 || 61–58
|- style="background:#bfb"
| 120 || August 14 || Cubs || 11–1 || Aaron Nola (11–3) || Cole Hamels (6–4) || — || 27,204 || 62–58
|- style="background:#bfb"
| 121 || August 15 || Cubs || 7–5 || Ranger Suárez (4–1) || Pedro Strop (2–5) || — || 37,064 || 63–58
|- style="background:#bfb"
| 122 || August 16 || Padres || 8–4 || Vince Velasquez (5–7) || Chris Paddack (7–6) || — || 26,084 || 64–58
|- style="background:#fbb"
| 123 || August 17 || Padres || 3–5 || Dinelson Lamet (2–2) || Nick Pivetta (4–5) || Kirby Yates (34) || 31,332 || 64–59
|- style="background:#fbb"
| 124 || August 18 || Padres || 2–3 || Joey Lucchesi (8–7) || Jared Hughes (3–5) || Kirby Yates (35) || 36,210 || 64–60
|- style="background:#bfb"
| 125 || August 20 || @ Red Sox || 3–2 || Aaron Nola (12–3) || Brian Johnson (1–2) || Héctor Neris (22) || 37,712 || 65–60
|- style="background:#bfb"
| 126 || August 21 || @ Red Sox || 5–2 || Jared Hughes (4–5) || Rick Porcello (11–10) || Héctor Neris (23) || 37,077 || 66–60
|- style="background:#fbb"
| 127 || August 23 || @ Marlins || 11–19 || Tyler Kinley (2–1) || Nick Pivetta (4–6) || — || 9,065 || 66–61
|- style="background:#bfb"
| 128 || August 24 || @ Marlins || 9–3 || Zach Eflin (8–11) || Jordan Yamamoto (4–5) || — || 12,981 || 67–61
|- style="background:#fbb"
| 129 || August 25 || @ Marlins || 2–3 || Elieser Hernández (3–5) || Aaron Nola (12–4) || Ryne Stanek (1) || 9,286|| 67–62
|- style="background:#bfb"
| 130 || August 26 || Pirates || 6–5  || Mike Morin (1–0) || Michael Feliz (2–4) || — || 27,932 || 68–62
|- style="background:#fbb"
| 131 || August 27 || Pirates || 4–5 || Felipe Vázquez (5–1) || Héctor Neris (2–5) || — || 26,200 || 68–63
|- style="background:#bfb"
| 132 || August 28 || Pirates || 12–3 || Vince Velasquez (6–7) || Mitch Keller (1–3) || — || 24,224 || 69–63
|- style="background:#fbb"
| 133 || August 30 || Mets || 5–11 || Justin Wilson (4–1) || Mike Morin (1–1) || — || 30,503 || 69–64
|- style="background:#fbb"
| 134 || August 31 || Mets || 3–6 || Steven Matz (9–8) || Jason Vargas (6–7) || Seth Lugo (4) || 40,690 || 69–65
|-

|- style="background:#bfb"
| 135 || September 1 || Mets || 5–2 || Héctor Neris (3–5) || Daniel Zamora (0–1) || — || 33,492 || 70–65
|- style="background:#bfb"
| 136 || September 2 || @ Reds || 7–1 || Drew Smyly (3–6) ||  || — || 19,631 || 71–65
|- style="background:#bfb"
| 137 || September 3 || @ Reds || 6–2 || Nick Vincent (1–2) || Amir Garrett (4–2) || — || 11,452 || 72–65
|- style="background:#fbb"
| 138 || September 4 || @ Reds || 5–8 || Michael Lorenzen (1–4) || José Álvarez (3–4) || Raisel Iglesias (29) || 13,448 || 72–66
|- style="background:#fbb"
| 139 || September 5 || @ Reds || 3–4  || Matt Bowman (2–0) || Nick Vincent (1–3) || — || 13,230 || 72–67
|- style="background:#fbb"
| 140 || September 6 || @ Mets || 4–5 || Edwin Díaz (2–7) || Mike Morin (1–2) || — || 28,107 || 72–68
|- style="background:#bfb"
| 141 || September 7 || @ Mets || 5–0 || Drew Smyly (4–6) || Marcus Stroman (7–13) || — || 28,848 || 73–68
|- style="background:#bfb"
| 142 || September 8 || @ Mets || 10–7 || Ranger Suárez (5–1) || Paul Sewald (0–1) || Héctor Neris (24) || 30,264 || 74–68
|- style="background:#fbb"
| 143 || September 9 || Braves || 2–7 || Mike Foltynewicz (6–5) || Aaron Nola (12–5) || — || 25,071 || 74–69
|- style="background:#bfb"
| 144 || September 10 || Braves || 6–5 || Blake Parker (3–2) || Max Fried (16–5) || Héctor Neris (25) || 24,220 || 75–69
|- style="background:#fbb"
| 145 || September 11 || Braves || 1–3 || Dallas Keuchel (8–5) || Zach Eflin (8–12) || Mark Melancon (11) || 23,243 || 75–70
|- style="background:#bfb"
| 146 || September 12 || Braves || 9–5 || Jared Hughes (5–5) || Julio Teherán (10–9) || — || 27,022 || 76–70
|- style="background:#fbb"
| 147 || September 14 || Red Sox || 1–2 || Matt Barnes (5–4) || Héctor Neris (3–6) || Brandon Workman (13) || 40,688 || 76–71
|- style="background:#fbb"
| 148 || September 15 || Red Sox || 3–6 || Rick Porcello (13–12) || Jason Vargas (6–8) || Brandon Workman (14) || 39,061 || 76–72
|- style="background:#bfb"
| 149 || September 17 || @ Braves || 5–4 || Vince Velasquez (7–7) || Dallas Keuchel (8–6) || Héctor Neris (27) || 28,843 || 77–72
|- style="background:#bfb"
| 150 || September 18 || @ Braves || 4–1 || Zach Eflin (9–12) || Julio Teherán (10–10) || Héctor Neris (28) || 27,937 || 78–72
|- style="background:#fbb"
| 151 || September 19 || @ Braves || 4–5 || Mike Soroka (13–4) || Aaron Nola (12–6) || Mark Melancon (12) || 33,223 || 78–73
|- style="background:#fbb"
| 152 || September 20 || @ Indians || 2–5 || Shane Bieber (15–7) || Drew Smyly (4–7) || Carlos Carrasco (1) || 26,329 || 78–74
|- style="background:#bfb"
| 153 || September 21 || @ Indians || 9–4 || Jason Vargas (7–8) || Óliver Pérez (2–4) || — || 32,791 || 79–74
|- style="background:#fbb"
| 154 || September 22 || @ Indians || 1–10 || Carlos Carrasco (6–7) || Vince Velasquez (7–8) || — || 25,309 || 79–75
|- style="background:#fbb"
| 155 || September 23 || @ Nationals || 2–7 || Patrick Corbin (14–7) || Zach Eflin (9–13) || — || 19,788 || 79–76
|- style="background:#fbb"
| 156 || September 24 (1) || @ Nationals || 1–4 || Tanner Rainey (2–3) || Nick Vincent (1–4) || Daniel Hudson (6) || 23,442 || 79–77
|- style="background:#fbb"
| 157 ||  || @ Nationals || 5–6 || Max Scherzer (11–7) || Aaron Nola (12–7) || Daniel Hudson (7) || 22,214 || 79–78
|- style="background:#fbb"
| 158 || September 25 || @ Nationals || 2–5 || Aníbal Sánchez (11–8) || Mike Morin (1–3) || Sean Doolittle (29) || 22,091 || 79–79
|- style="background:#fbb"
| 159 || September 26 || @ Nationals || 3–6 ||  || Jason Vargas (7–9) || Daniel Hudson (8) || 22,253 || 79–80
|- style="background:#bfb"
| 160 || September 27 || Marlins || 5–4  || Ranger Suárez (6–1) || Adam Conley (2–11) || — || 24,143 || 80–80
|- style="background:#bfb"
| 161 || September 28 || Marlins || 9–3 || Zach Eflin (10–13) || Caleb Smith (10–11) || — || 25,156 || 81–80
|- style="background:#fbb"
| 162 || September 29 || Marlins || 3–4 || Sandy Alcántara (6–14) || Blake Parker (3–3) || Tyler Kinley (1) || 31,805 || 81–81
|-

Roster
All players who made an appearance for the Phillies during 2019 are included.

Farm system

References

External links
 2019 Philadelphia Phillies season at Baseball Reference
 Philadelphia Phillies' official website

Philadelphia Phillies seasons
Philadelphia Phillies
Philadelphia Phillies